Ángela Hernández Núñez (born May 6, 1954) is a writer, educator and feminist in the Dominican Republic.

Life
Núñez was born in Jarabacoa and studied chemical engineering at the Universidad Autónoma de Santo Domingo. She was the director of the Centro Nacional de Ayuda y Estudio de la Mujer and a member of the Dominican Chapter of Criticism for Latin America. She was an active member of the Circulo de Mujeres Poetas (Circle of Women poets) and a founding member of the Grupo de Mujeres Creadoras (Group of Creative Women).

In 1998 she was awarded the Dominican National Literary Award for her short story, Piedra de Sacrificio.

Selected works 
 Emergencia del silencio (Emerging from silence), essays (1985)
  Tizne y cristal (Dust and crystal), poems (1985)
 Edades del asombro (Ages of amazement), poems (1985)
 De críticos y creadores (Critics and creators), essays (1988)
 Alótropos (Allotropes), stories (1989)
 Masticar una rosa (To chew a rose), stories (1993)
 Arca espejada (Mirrored ark) (1994)
 Telar de rebeldía (Loom of defiance), poems (1998)
 Piedra de sacrificio (Sacrificial stone), stories 1999), won the Premio Nacional de Cuentos

Awards
1998 Dominican National Literary Award: Short Story for Piedra de Sacrifico

References 

1954 births
Living people
20th-century Dominican Republic poets
Dominican Republic short story writers
Dominican Republic activists
Dominican Republic women activists
Dominican Republic women poets
20th-century women writers